Cerithiopsis denticulata is a species of minute sea snail, a marine gastropod mollusc in the family Cerithiopsidae.

The species was described by Cecalupo and Robba in 2010.

References

 Oliver J.D., Templado J. & Kersting D. 2012. Gasterópodos marinos de las islas Columbretes (Mediterráneo occidental). Iberus, 30(2): 49-87

Gastropods described in 2010
denticulata